The Nieuport-Delage NiD 50 HB.4 was a twin-engined bomber / reconnaissance floatplane, designed in the latter half of the 1920s, to the 1928 HB.4 specification from the Service Technique de l'Aéronautique (STAé), for a four-seat seaplane bomber. Development was cancelled before the first prototype was completed.

Development
Issued in January 1928, the STAé published an offshore torpedo bomber seaplane HB.4 specification. Nieuport-Astra responded and exhibited the partially complete NiD 50 HB.4 at the 1928 Paris Aero Salon.

The 4 crew members were to have consisted of a gunner in the nose, pilot, navigator and gunner in the rear fuselage.

Specifications (NiD-50 HB.4)

References

1920s French aircraft